L. Ron Hubbard was the inventor of Dianetics and founder of Scientology. Born in Tilden, Nebraska in March 1911, Hubbard grew up with his family in Helena, Montana. He was unusually well-traveled for a young man of his time due to his father's frequent relocations in connection with his service in the United States Navy. He lived in a number of locations in the United States and traveled to Guam, the Philippines, China, and Japan. He enrolled at George Washington University in 1930 to study civil engineering, but dropped out in his second year. While at GWU, he organized an expedition to the Caribbean for fellow students which looms large in his official biography but was a flop according to contemporary accounts. He subsequently spent time in Puerto Rico panning for gold, before returning to the United States, marrying his pregnant girlfriend, and embarking on a career as a "penny-a-word" writer.

The Church of Scientology depicts Hubbard in hagiographic terms.

Family and ancestry 
Lafayette Ronald Hubbard was born on March 13, 1911, in Tilden, Nebraska. He was the only child of Harry Ross Hubbard, a former United States Navy sailor who worked as a newspaper employee at the time of his son's birth, and Ledora May Waterbury, a housewife who had originally trained as a teacher.  L. Ron was named after his maternal grandfather, Lafayette "Lafe" O. Waterbury.

When Ron was two, the family moved from Nebraska to Montana. Hubbard's father worked as a manager and bookkeeper, first for a local theater and later for a coal company owned by his father-in-law. The elder Hubbard re-enlisted in the Navy when the United States entered World War I in April 1917, while his mother Ledora May worked as a clerk for the state government.

The Hubbard family was Methodist, though L. Ron would later describe his grandfather as a "devout atheist".

First stay in D.C.: Boy Scouts and "Snake" Thompson 

During the 1920s, the Hubbards repeatedly relocated around the United States and overseas. Harry Hubbard rejoined the Navy as an enlisted man but was promoted to Ensign in October 1918 and Lieutenant in November 1919. His posting aboard the USS Oklahoma in 1921 required his wife and son to relocate to the ship's home ports, first San Diego, then Seattle.

The Hubbards traveled to Washington, D.C. in 1923 aboard the USS U.S. Grant, traveling from Seattle to Hampton Roads, Virginia, via the Panama Canal. During this trip, Hubbard reportedly received an education in Freudian psychology from Commander Joseph "Snake" Thompson, a U.S. Navy psychoanalyst and student of Sigmund Freud. Hubbard later said that through Thompson's friendship, "I attended many lectures given at naval hospitals and generally became conversant with psychoanalysis as it had been exported from Austria by Freud." Another Scientology text states that Thompson spent "many an afternoon in the Library of Congress teaching L. Ron Hubbard what he [knew] of the human mind."  There is now some independent confirmation of Hubbard's claims.

Hubbard joined the local Boy Scouts and later said that when he was 13, he became the "youngest Eagle Scout in the country". The Boy Scouts of America has said that, at the time, it did not keep a record of the ages of its Eagle Scouts, only an alphabetical list of those who had received the award. Journalist Michael Streeter comments that, in light of this, "it remains unclear just how Hubbard would have known he was its youngest member."

The following year, Harry Ross Hubbard was posted to Puget Sound Naval Shipyard at Bremerton, Washington. His son was enrolled at Union High School, Bremerton and later studied at Queen Anne High School in Seattle. In 1927, Hubbard's father was sent to the U.S. Naval Station in Guam. Although Hubbard's mother also went to Guam, Hubbard himself did not accompany them but was placed in his grandparents' care in Helena, Montana, to complete his schooling.

Travels in the Far East and Pacific

First trip to Asia 

Between 1927 and 1929, Hubbard traveled to Japan, China, the Philippines, and Guam. What is Scientology and other Scientology texts present this era as a time when he sought, and was freely offered, ancient Eastern wisdom but found it lacking, as he had earlier with Western science. A biographical account in Hubbard's 1982 novel Battlefield Earth says that, "he worked... aboard a coastal trader which plied the seas between Japan and Java. He came to know old Shanghai, Beijing and the Western Hills at a time when few Westerners could enter China." He is said to have spent weeks questioning Buddhist lamas and watching them meditate. He also recounted meeting Old Mayo, supposedly the last Chinese magician in a line that stretched back to the Court of Kublai Khan. According to the Church of Scientology, these travels were funded by his "wealthy grandfather". Hubbard is described not as a tourist but as a gifted student, intensely curious for answers to human suffering and warmly received everywhere because he was perceived as special. He is purported to have faced many dangers in the company of "Major Ian Macbean of the British Secret Service", including an "encounter with Cantonese pirates, the engineering of a jungle road across Guam's denser corner, and the evening he decked an Italian swordsman named Giovinni. (Although not before he took a saber cut across the left cheek, and Macbean nearly lost a hand)."

Hubbard's unofficial biographers present a very different account of his Asian travels, drawing on his school records, his contemporary diaries, and his father's service record. Hubbard recorded two trips to the east coast of China in his diaries. The first was made in the company of his mother while traveling from the United States to Guam in 1927. It consisted of a brief stop-over in two Chinese ports before the pair transferred to a U.S. Navy transport, the USS Gold Star, for the journey to Guam. Hubbard spent about six weeks on the island before returning to the United States aboard the USS Nitro. He used his diary to record his impressions of the places he visited, noting his unfavorable impression of the poverty and the appearance of the inhabitants of Japan and China, whom he described as "gooks", "lazy", and "ignorant". His second visit was a family holiday that took Hubbard and his parents to China via the Philippines in 1928. It is unclear whether he ever traveled to western China, Tibet, or India; Atack comments that Hubbard's only corroborated visit to India appears to have been a flight change at Calcutta in 1959.

On his return to the United States in September 1927, Hubbard enrolled at Helena High School, but earned poor grades. He abandoned school the following May and went back west to stay with his aunt and uncle in Seattle. In June, he traveled to Guam on a U.S. Navy transport, the USS Henderson, to reunite with his parents. His mother took over his education in the hope of putting him forward for the entrance examination to the United States Naval Academy at Annapolis, Maryland.

Second trip to Asia 

A number of naval families, including Hubbard's, traveled from Guam to China aboard the USS Gold Star between October and December 1928. The ship visited Manila in the Philippines and traveled on to Qingdao (Tsingtao), from where Hubbard and his parents traveled inland to Beijing, before returning to the ship for transport to Shanghai and Hong Kong and finally back to Guam. The Church of Scientology presents a completely different version of this family holiday, stating that Hubbard "made his way deep into Manchuria's Western Hills and beyond – to break bread with Mongolian bandits, share campfires with Siberian shamans and befriend the last in the line of magicians from the court of Kublai Khan." According to Atack, these occurrences are not mentioned in the diary that Hubbard kept of his trip. Many years later, Hubbard said that "I was a harum-scarum kid; I wasn't thinking about deep philosophic problems."

As on his previous trip, Hubbard recorded his impressions in his diary. He remained unimpressed with China. After seeing Qingdao he wrote: "A Chinaman can not live up to a thing, he always drags it down." He characterized the sights of Beijing as "rubberneck stations" for tourists and described the palaces of the Forbidden City as "very trashy-looking" and "not worth mentioning". He visited a section of the Great Wall of China near Beijing, which did impress him, but his overall conclusion of the Chinese was very negative: "They smell of all the baths they didn't take. The trouble with China is, there are too many chinks here."

Back on Guam, Hubbard spent much of his time writing dozens of short stories and essays. He is said to have "befriend[ed] the local Chamorros and [taught] in the native schools", exploring "cliff-side caves to disabuse local villagers of a devil named Tadamona". Despite his mother's assistance with his education, he failed the Naval Academy entrance examination.

Return to D.C.
His father's next posting took the family to Washington, D.C., where Hubbard was sent to study at the Swavely Preparatory School in Manassas, Virginia within the D.C. metropolitan area. The Hubbards returned to Helena, Montana for a short visit to Hubbard's grandparents in August 1929 before he enrolled at Swavely the following month.

Hubbard proved unable to enter the Naval Academy because he was found to be too near-sighted to meet the physical admission criteria.  In the late 1940s, Hubbard wrote a series of private Affirmations in which he tells himself "your eyes are getting progressively better. They became bad when you used them as an excuse to escape the naval academy."

In February 1930 he enrolled at Woodward School for Boys in Washington, D.C. as a means of earning credits for admission to George Washington University, thereby avoiding the university's entrance examination, and successfully graduated in June. The following September, he entered George Washington University as a freshman.

While at Woodward, the 19-year-old Hubbard enlisted as a Private in the United States Marine Corps Reserve, stating his age as 21 and listing his profession as "photographer". He was promoted to First Sergeant only six weeks later, a development that Atack attributes to the fact that the unit he joined – the 20th Marine Corps Reserve – was actually a training unit connected with George Washington University. His character was rated "excellent" but on October 22, 1931 he was discharged with the notation, "Not to be re-enlisted." Despite his limited experience of the Marine Corps, he told readers of Adventure magazine in October 1935 that "I've known the Corps from Quantico to Peiping, from the South Pacific to the West Indies."

Hubbard later recalled: 
 "My father said I had to go to university, so he sent me to a prep school in Virginia where I studied for about four months [...] and got into George Washington University. They regretted it from there on because I never seemed to stay with the curriculum. At last they said, "Well, after all, you're not going to practice engineering. We might as well pass you in a few of these courses."

University career

Nuclear physicist claims 

Hubbard's two-year career at George Washington University looms large in his own accounts and the biographies published by the Church of Scientology.  George Malko comments in Scientology: The Now Religion,

Official biographical accounts of his life state that his "study of engineering, mathematics and nuclear physics laid the foundation for his later philosophical research." A profile in one of his books attributes "the mathematical precision of the Scientology Religion" to his studies. According to one Scientology account,

Hubbard's education in "atomic and molecular phenomena" is highlighted in many Scientology biographies. According to one, he was "a member of the first U.S. course in formal education in what is called today nuclear physics." A 1961 publication incorrectly calls him "L. Ron Hubbard, C.Eng., Ph.D., a nuclear physicist ... educated in advanced physics and higher mathematics and also a student of Sigmund Freud and others, [who] began his present researches thirty years ago at George Washington University." In 1959, another Scientology publication described him as "Doctor Hubbard, American nuclear physicist and leading world authority on the subject of life sources and mental energies and structures." He told Scientologists in later years that "Nearly all nuclear physicists – atomic and molecular phenomena boys – 'Buck Rogers Boys', we were known as ... Like so many physicists I wrote science fiction for years, and that was the only remunerative use I made of this material."

One account published by the Church of Scientology says that Hubbard theorized that "the world of subatomic particles might possibly provide a clue to the human thought process" and he was "concerned for the safety of the world, recognising that if man were to handle the atom sanely for the greatest benefit, he would first have to learn to handle himself." He enrolled on a nuclear physics course "to synthesise and test all knowledge for what was observable, workable and could truly help solve man's problems." Another profile calls him "a product of the atomic age" and describes how his classmates dreamed of unlocking the energy of the atom, while Hubbard himself sought to "discover the basic equations of life force, simply, to him, another kind of energy." Hubbard stated that he "set out to find out from nuclear physics a knowledge of the physical universe, something entirely lacking in Asian philosophy."

Other Scientology accounts present a different perspective. A 1959 biography describes Hubbard as "never noted for being in class" and says that he "thoroughly detest[ed] his subjects." He attributed his choice of course to his father, having "decreed that I should study engineering and mathematics and so I found myself obediently studying." In a 1953 lecture, he said that he was "forced into engineering, mathematics, majoring in nuclear physics – very antipathetic to me, but there was order and there was discipline ..." Christiansen comments that the claims made about Hubbard's expertise and scientific knowledge are crucial to Scientology's own self-image and legitimation. Hubbard is presented as "a man with an impressive amount of various theoretical as well as practical personal competences and educational qualifications." Scientology traces its own origins to Hubbard's "scientific" methodology, which he is said to have learned while at university. Although Scientology positions itself as a religious belief, it nonetheless claims to be a true science, a "technology" capable of achieving precise and replicable results.

Academic record and extracurricular activities 
Hubbard's academic record, which came to light in the 1970s, revealed that he had been a student in George Washington University's School of Engineering and had majored in civil engineering. He attended the summer semester in 1931 and the fall and spring semesters in 1931–32. In September 1931, he was placed on probation and he failed to return for the fall 1932 semester. A Scientology account says that he "excell[ed] in but thoroughly detest[ed] his subjects"; while the latter may have been true, the former certainly was not, as his grades were consistently poor. At the end of his first year, he received a D average grade, earning an A for physical education, B for English, C for mechanical engineering, D for general chemistry and Fs for German and calculus. During his second year, he enrolled in a class on atomic and molecular physics – the "nuclear physics" course cited in his official biographies – but earned an F grade. His other grades were also poor, ranging from a B for English to D in calculus and electrical and magnetic physics. He dropped out soon afterwards. Although Hubbard told Look magazine in 1950 that "I never took my degree," a biography published a few years later by the Church of Scientology's Ability magazine nonetheless identifies him as the holder of a "B. S. in Civil Engineering".

Hubbard was far more interested in extracurricular activities, particularly writing and participating in the university flying club. He wrote for the George Washington University student newspaper, The University Hatchet, as a reporter for a few months in 1931. According to official biographies, "he earned his wings as a pioneering barnstormer at the dawn of American aviation" and became "a roving reporter for Sportsman Pilot" who "helped inspire a generation of pilots who would take America to world airpower." One account published by the Church of Scientology states that he was "recognized as one of the country's most outstanding pilots. With virtually no training time, he takes up powered flight and barnstorms throughout the Midwest." His pilot's license, however, records that he only qualified to fly gliders rather than powered aircraft.

Hubbard left the university after two years and married in 1933. He began writing for the popular pulp magazines at that time. His first story was "The Green God," which appeared in Thrilling Adventures in 1934. According to James R. Lewis, Associate Professor of Religion at University of Tromso, he was a quick and prolific writer, which fellow authors envied. According to the Church of Scientology, Hubbard's decision to drop out of university was not the result of educational failure on his part, but was instead because he found that "beyond a basic methodology, university offered nothing." Hubbard is said to have "decid[ed] that formal study had nothing more to offer".

Expeditions

Caribbean Motion Picture Expedition 
Hubbard's final semester at George Washington University saw him embark on what the Church of Scientology describes as a career as an "adventurer and explorer". In May 1932, he announced in The University Hatchet that he had organized an expedition to the Caribbean for "fifty young gentleman rovers" aboard the schooner Doris Hamlin. The aims of the "Caribbean Motion Picture Expedition" were to explore and film the pirate "strongholds and bivouacs of the Spanish Main" and to "collect whatever one collects for exhibits in museums".

The expedition did not go according to plan after its departure from Baltimore on June 23, 1932. Ten of the "gentleman rovers" pulled out before the start and the ship was blown far off course by storms, making an unplanned first landfall at Bermuda. Eleven more members of the expedition quit while there, before the ship sailed on to its intended first port of call, Martinique. En route, it was discovered that the ship's fresh water had all leaked away. More expedition members abandoned ship on arrival. As the expedition was critically short of money, the ship's owners ordered it to return to Baltimore, bringing to an end what the captain described as "the worst trip I ever made". Hubbard nonetheless presented the expedition as a success and blamed the captain for its travails: "the ship's dour Captain Garfield proved himself far less than a Captain Courageous, requiring Ron Hubbard's hand at both the helm and the charts."

The Church of Scientology states that a "National Museum" (it does not specify which one) acquired specimens collected by the expedition and The New York Times purchased some of its photographs. Hubbard's book Mission into Time states that the expedition's underwater films and specimens "provided the Hydrographic Office and the University of Michigan with invaluable data for the furtherance of their research." However, Hubbard's unofficial biographer Russell Miller reports that The New York Times "hold[s] no photographs from the expedition, [has] no evidence that it was ever intended to buy such photographs, nor indeed any indication that the newspaper was even aware of the expedition's existence," and that neither the U.S. Hydrographic Office nor the University of Michigan has any record of films or specimens from the expedition.

According to the Church of Scientology, "even some fifty years later, those who sailed with Mr. Hubbard in 1932 would still speak of that voyage as the one grand adventure in the twilight of their youth." Hubbard put it somewhat differently, writing in 1935 that the expedition "was a crazy idea at best, and I knew it, but I went ahead anyway, chartered a four-masted schooner and embarked with some fifty luckless souls who haven't stopped their cursings yet." He told Look magazine in 1950 that the Caribbean Motion Picture Expedition "was a two-bit expedition and financial bust, and I quit the ship at Puerto Rico in 1933." The collapse of the expedition led a number of its members to make legal claims against Hubbard for refunds.

Puerto Rican Mineralogical Expedition 

After leaving university, Hubbard is said to have carried out a further expedition to Puerto Rico. It is described by a 1959 biography as having been undertaken to "blow off steam by leading an expedition into Central America ". An account published in Mission into Time states "Conducting the West Indies Minerals Survey, he made the first complete mineralogical survey of Puerto Rico. This was pioneer exploration in the great tradition, opening up a predictable, accurate body of data for the benefit of others. Later, in other, less materialistic fields, this was to be his way many, many times over." The Church of Scientology claims that Hubbard's father "had long dreamed of augmenting his Lieutenant's pay with a mining venture and a bit of investment capital from like-minded officers" and dispatched Hubbard to the Puerto Rican hinterland where he "sluiced inland rivers and criss-crossed the island in search of elusive gold." While there, Hubbard "conducted much ethnological work amongst the interior villages and (Jibarros) native hillsmen".

The expedition's existence has been questioned by Hubbard's unofficial biographers. Miller states that neither the United States Geological Survey nor the Puerto Rican Department of Natural Resources have records of any such expedition. Hubbard stayed on Puerto Rico from November 1932 to mid-February 1933. According to Miller, Hubbard went there for an entirely different purpose. Harry Ross Hubbard sent a letter to the Navy Department on October 13, 1932, in which he requested a passage for his son to San Juan to "place his services at the disposal of the American Red Cross in their relief work on that island." Three weeks earlier, Puerto Rico had been hit by the 1932 San Ciprian hurricane and suffered catastrophic damage. The storm killed 225 people, injured 3,000 more, and left over 100,000 people homeless. Hubbard traveled to the island aboard the USS Kittery, arriving on November 4. It is unclear whether he contributed to the Red Cross relief effort, though in a 1957 lecture he said that he had been "a field executive with the American Red Cross in the Puerto Rico hurricane disaster."

At some point during his short stay on the island, he appears to have done some work for a Washington D.C. firm called West Indies Minerals Incorporated. A letter dated February 16, 1933 describes Hubbard as the company's "field representative" who accompanied the letter's author on a survey of a small property near the town of Luquillo, Puerto Rico. According to his own account, Hubbard spent much of his time prospecting unsuccessfully for gold. A photograph published in Hubbard's book Mission into Time shows him using a gold pan alongside the caption "Sluicing with crews on Corozal River '32" and an article in the August 18, 1933 Washington Daily News describes Hubbard as having "left here last year for Antilles, West Indies, in search of gold so that he might return and marry the girl he met shortly before his departure". In 1935, Hubbard wrote in Adventure magazine,

He married the girl in question, Margaret "Polly" Grubb, on April 13, 1933. Chronically short of money, he turned to full-time fiction writing to support himself and his new wife; six of his pieces were published commercially during 1932 to 1933 as he embarked on a literary career that made him a somewhat well-known figure in the world of pulp magazine fiction.

Significance for Scientology 

Hubbard's early life is accorded great significance by the Church of Scientology, which draws on his legacy as its ultimate source of doctrine and legitimacy. Dorthe Refslund Christensen comments:

Hubbard portrayed himself as a pioneering explorer, world traveler and nuclear physicist. By contrast, his critics have characterized him as a liar, charlatan, and madman. Many of his autobiographical statements have been proven to be fictitious. The Church's portrayal of Hubbard's life displays many standard features of hagiography, such as the emphasis on the continuity of the subject's life. Events are woven together in a seamless tapestry that culminates in the subject's achievement of his spiritual goals. They are presented as part of a "master plan" that gives meaning to the subject's life in the context of a belief system. By doing this, the belief system is legitimized and given an aspect of genuineness through stressing its originator's personal qualities.

Hubbard is therefore portrayed, as he put it himself, as a man who "knew exactly where I was going" from the age of three. He is presented as a person who constantly worked towards a single objective. Each event in his life is seen as a stepping stone along the way to the development of Dianetics and Scientology. He is cast as a singular and forward-thinking individual whose unique qualities and knowledge are essential prerequisites for his discoveries. As the Church puts it, "even in his early youth he exemplified a rare sense of purpose and dedication which, combined with his adventurous spirit, made him a living legend." The story of Hubbard's early life, as told by the Church, is closely related to Scientology's own self-image as a synthesis of Western scientific precision with Eastern philosophy. His claimed knowledge of these fields and practices underlines his claim to have founded a religion that combines the best of both to appeal to all people.

Hagiography
Some early Scientology biographies present a fictitious family heritage for Hubbard. According to an account published in the Church of Scientology's Ability magazine in 1959, Hubbard was "descended from Count de Loup who entered England with the Norman invasion and became the founder of the English de Wolfe family which emigrated to America in the 17th century. On his father's side, from the English Hubbards, who came to America in the 19th century." The story went that Count de Loup (or de Loupe) was a French courtier who saved the King of France from an attack by a wolf; the grateful monarch bestowed the title of Count de Loupe, which was eventually anglicized to "De Wolf", the name of Hubbard's maternal grandfather. No records exist to substantiate this story. Harry Ross Hubbard was an orphan, born Henry August Wilson in August 1886, who had been adopted by an Iowa farming couple by the name of Hubbard. The couple changed his given names to Harry Ross.

A biographical profile published by the Church of Scientology in 1973 states that the young Hubbard "spent many of his childhood years on a large cattle ranch in Montana" that was owned by his wealthy grandfather, Lafe Waterbury. According to Church accounts, Hubbard passed long days on the ranch "riding, breaking broncos, hunting coyote and taking his first steps as an explorer." Another Church biography describes his grandfather as a "wealthy Western cattleman" from whom Hubbard "inherited his fortune and family interests in America, Southern Africa, etc."

Contemporary records and Hubbard's relatives contradict this depiction. Hubbard's grandfather, Lafe Waterbury, briefly owned a plot of land covering 320 acres (0.5 mi2) near Kalispell, Montana, where he pastured horses and worked as a veterinarian. A local city directory for 1913 stated Waterbury's assets as a relatively modest $1,550. The Hubbards and Waterburys lived in a pair of townhouses, not a ranch, in the center of Helena, only two blocks from each other and not far from the Montana State Capitol. They also owned a small plot outside the city. Hubbard's aunt told the Los Angeles Times in 1990 that the family did not have a ranch, "just several acres (with) a barn on it. ... We had one cow (and) four or five horses."

Biographical accounts published by the Church of Scientology depict Hubbard as a child prodigy. He is portrayed as riding a horse before he was able to walk and able to read and write by the time he was four. According to a Scientology account, the young Hubbard lived in the rugged West, "[r]iding horses at the age of three and a half" and facing dangers such as "escaping a pack of coyotes astride his mare named Nancy Hanks." He was said to have "considered until he was 10 years old that the handling of a rifle or hunting coyotes or trying to break broncos was more useful than school knowledge", and "[a]ttempts to send him to school were seldom availing."

According to the Church publication What is Scientology?, Hubbard was "reading and writing at an early age, and soon satisfying his insatiable curiosity with the works of Shakespeare, the Greek philosophers, and other classics." His mother Ledora is described as "a rarity in her time. A thoroughly educated woman, who had attended teacher's college prior to her marriage to Ron's father, she was aptly suited to tutor her young son." Christensen comments that this presentation of the exceptional qualities of his mother is typical of hagiographies – such as the Virgin Mary – and forms a kind of after-the-event rationalization, in which qualities assigned to the subject are also attributed to the subject's mother. Presenting Ledora as "aptly suited" to educate her son suggests that she was, in effect, chosen to be his mother; she is not presented as responsible for stimulating her son's interest in the classics but was there simply to assist his development. (Indeed, as Christiansen notes, his parents do not have important roles in his official biography and are only significantly mentioned at the beginning of the story, where their respective professions are emphasized.)

Hubbard's official biographers also state that, during his childhood in Montana, he was befriended by "Old Tom", a medicine man from the Native American Blackfeet tribe. He is also purported to have become, at six years old, "one of the few whites ever admitted into Blackfoot society as a bona fide blood brother". This has been disputed by his unofficial biographers. Jon Atack notes that the Blackfoot reservation was over a hundred miles away from Helena. A Los Angeles Times investigation in 1990 reported that "Old Tom" was not listed in a 1907 register of the Blackfeet and that the tribe did not practice blood brotherhood. Although the Church of Scientology states that Hubbard was awarded blood brotherhood "in a ceremony that is still recalled by tribal elders", a Scientologist of fractional Blackfoot ancestry sought during the mid-1980s to prove that Hubbard had been a Blackfoot blood brother but was unsuccessful.

A Scientology biography states that Hubbard's achievement of Eagle Scout status was "an early indication that he did not plan to live an ordinary life." Christiansen notes that this passage implies that Hubbard consciously "planned" to live an extraordinary life, strengthening the underlying idea that from early childhood he worked towards the goals that led to Scientology. He was presented to President Calvin Coolidge in a ceremony that the Church of Scientology describes as Hubbard having "represented American Scouting at the White House", by which time "the thirteen-year-old L. Ron Hubbard had become a reasonably famous figure in fairly adventurous circles." Atack describes the event more prosaically as a meet-and-greet in which Hubbard was one of forty boys who spoke their names to the President and shook his hand. Another Scientology biography says that Hubbard became "the fast friend of the President's son, Calvin Coolidge, Jr., whose untimely death is probably responsible for L. Ron Hubbard's early interest in healing research." Atack deems this fictitious, as Calvin Coolidge, Jr. and Hubbard never crossed paths.

The Danish historian of religions Dorthe Refslund Christensen notes that many aspects of the official version of Hubbard's early life parallel more conventional religious narratives, notably the life of Jesus. Many details of Hubbard's early life remain disputed; critics of Scientology cast doubt on whether he had the educational and personal background claimed by the Church. According to James R. Lewis and Olav Hammer, in Scientology, this hagiographic "construction of Hubbard as a religious ideal implies the construction of Scientology's texts as humanity's most important treasure and vice versa." Religious tradition in Scientology is based on two essential things, Hubbard's individuality and texts written by him.

Notes

References 
 Atack, Jon. A Piece of Blue Sky: Scientology, Dianetics, and L. Ron Hubbard exposed. Carol Publishing Group, 1990. 
 Christensen, Dorthe Refslund. Lewis, James R. & Petersen, Jesper Aagaard eds. Controversial new religions. Oxford University Press, 2005. 
 Miller, Russell. Bare-faced Messiah: the true story of L. Ron Hubbard. Joseph, 1987. 
 Streeter, Michael. Behind closed doors: the power and influence of secret societies. New Holland Publishers, 2008. 
 Tucker, Ruth. Another Gospel: Cults, Alternative Religions, and the New Age Movement. Zondervan, 2004. 
 Whitehead, Harriet. Renunciation and reformulation: a study of conversion in an American sect. Cornell University Press, 1987. 

L. Ron Hubbard
Hubbard, L. Ron